Blaine County Courthouse may refer to:

Blaine County Courthouse (Idaho), Hailey, Idaho
Blaine County Courthouse (Oklahoma), Watonga, Oklahoma